Cervignano d'Adda is a comune (municipality) in the Province of Lodi in the Italian region Lombardy, located about  southeast of Milan and about  southeast of Lodi.

Cervignano d'Adda borders the following municipalities: Zelo Buon Persico, Mulazzano, Galgagnano.

References

Cities and towns in Lombardy